Transition to war (TTW) is a North Atlantic Treaty Organization (NATO) military term referring to a period of international tension during which government and society move to an open (but not necessarily declared) war footing. The period after this is considered to be war, conventional or otherwise, but the term TTW found its origins in the peak of the Cold War as a key NATO concept within the tripwire escalation of the DEFCON status. This could include the suspension of peacetime services, closing motorways to all but military traffic and the internment of subversives without charge or trial.

Legal framework

Emergency legislation

The legislation that facilitates the transition to war is pre-drafted and has been in existence since the 1930s, when World War II required certain legislation to be passed to prosecute the war effectively. This mostly included the Emergency Powers (Defence) Act 1939 and the controversial Defence Regulation 18B, which allowed the detention of subversives without charge or trial. A number of these emergency regulations lasted until the mid-1950s, and were finally abolished with the end of rationing in 1954.

However the Cold War brought the possibility of war with the Soviet Union, which would require similar legislation to allow NATO countries to defend themselves effectively. Hence pre-drafted legislation governing every aspect of life in the United Kingdom, consisting of the Emergency Powers (Defence) Bill, Defence (Machinery of Government) Regulations and other laws were devised. Other regulations included:

 The Defence (Public Safety) Regulations that allowed for such things as the prevention of interference with essential services and the control of newspapers and other means of communication. This could mean postal and press censorship, among other things.
The Defence (Essential Supplies, Works and Services) Regulations that would give the power to  control all land and property, industry and transport. This could entail the closing motorways to all but military traffic, restricting key workers from leaving their posts, commandeering buildings, commandeering of British Airways, etc.
The Defence (Public Safety and Order) Regulations that were concerned with such matters as public shelter, the control of lighting and sound and the restriction of the public electricity supply. Electricity could be restricted for advertising and display purposes, blackout regulations could be implemented, extra control of BBC, ITV and Independent Local Radio and the commandeering of houses and schools for public feeding centres or  even detention camps. Sus law could be reinstated or more tightly enforced to prevent sabotage.
The Defence (Births, Marriages and Deaths) Regulations.
The Defence (Cash) Regulations which were intended to restrict the amount of money that could be taken out of bank and building society accounts at any one time, which is intended to prevent a currency crisis and keep supplies of money secure.

Other existing legislation governing everyday matters already allows for special provisions in a national emergency. For example, the Energy Act 1976 allows the Secretary of State to create regulations governing the production, distribution and use of coal, petrol, diesel, gas, biofuels and electricity in a crisis. For example, it could allow rationing, power cuts in certain areas to allow blackouts near key installations, restrictions on civilian use of cars and the like.

The Broadcasting Act 1980 allows the governments to take over editorial control of the BBC, ITV, Independent Local Radio and Independent National Radio in a national emergency.

The Railways Act 1976 has similar provisions with regard to the British railway system. The minister or Secretary of State can take control of the railways in the event of war, including the Channel Tunnel.

How these laws would be implemented

Since this legislation is pre-drafted, it would be either rushed through Parliament using the Parliament Acts or be done through an Order in Council, which is essentially a royal decree. The bills themselves would be passed in three stages. The first stage is a covert review of what to do and what needs to be revised, done only by ministers and civil servants. The second stage is more overt and  would include 24-hour manning of government departments, people being briefed of their wartime roles, testing of sirens and other communication systems, cancelling police leave and mobilising the armed forces (including reservists). The third and final stage would be the activation of war measures, such as local councils setting up refugee centres and the like.

The actual bills would effectively be enabling acts allowing for the implementation of the pre-drafted legislation. The bills' content was not divulged both on the grounds of national security and because it would be politically suicidal for the party in charge at that time to do so considering their draconian nature. It would also be unconstitutional, as one parliament would be effectively determining the affairs of a future one. However, they consisted of the Special Powers Bill, which allowed the police extra powers to stop, search and arrest people, restrictions on ships and aircrew, along with compensation.

The second, The Readiness Bill, covered the requisitioning of private property (including land, buildings, vehicles, ships and aircraft), preventing key workers from leaving their employment, widening the role of the armed forces and fire brigades, reorganising the National Health Service, control of transport, extra police powers, regulation of money supply and currency controls and compensation.

The General Bill would be the third and final stage of putting Britain on a war footing. While building on the other two, it would also provide the legal framework for regional government (national government could fail), including the powers of the regional commissioner. Along with this would be the power to take over the BBC (which already exists), control labour, the registration of births, deaths and marriages, the administration of justice (jury trials may be suspended and special courts of justice may be established, for example. Also, subversives could be arrested by police and detained without charge or trial) and compensation.

When these were drafted, it was assumed that both the House of Commons and the House of Lords were sitting at the time of the crisis and become acts within a few hours or days, though it would be more problematic if Parliament was in recess, as it would take longer to enact the acts. The new legislation would have to be publicised and printed within two days.

Post-Cold War era

With the end of the Cold War in the late 1980s and early 1990s, the Northern Ireland Peace Process and the Human Rights Act 1998 passing into law, these emergency powers and the legal framework that supported them became dated and needed re-examining. The Civil Contingencies Act 2004 was introduced to provide a new enabling power to introduce emergency regulations, but it cannot be used by the Government to alter the Human Rights Act 1998.

What happens during the transition to war 

The following table gives examples of what could happen in a state of emergency and a transition to a war footing in the UK, and why, but these may not necessarily happen in the order listed or at all.

"Reservists" are any members of the public who serve in the armed forces and emergency services on a part-time basis. Many will hold down regular civilian jobs and be called up on a "when needed" basis. Reserve forces include the Territorial Army, Royal Naval Reserve, Royal Air Force Volunteer Reserve, Royal Marines Reserve, retained firefighters and the Special Constabulary. Groups like the RNLI, the Salvation Army and the WRVS are charitable organisations but are pressed into service to supplement the civil defence, the armed forces and post-attack distribution of aid.

See also
Protect and Survive
Civil Defence Information Bulletin, a precursor to Protect and Survive
Emergency Broadcast System
Emergency Alert System
CONELRAD
HANDEL
Wartime Broadcasting Service - a broadcasting service run by the BBC that would operate after a nuclear attack or if conventional bombing had destroyed conventional broadcasting systems.
Four-minute warning
Threads (1984 film) - a 1984 BBC docudrama which simulates a transition to war

References

External links
UKWMO Communications chain - message dissemination
Britain's war and transition to war plans from the cold war era
In Time of Crisis: 'Secret State' documentary on the emergency powers (part one)
In Time of Crisis (part two)
In Time of Crisis (part three)

NATO
Military terminology